Coy Placido (born Jerico Calica Placido, October 20, 1977) is the composer and guitarist of the Filipino bands sessiOnroad Top Junk and Blue Ruins.

Career
Coy Placido is a  songwriter and a founding member of sessiOnroad and the indie band Top Junk. He is also a graphic artist.

Personal life
Coy is married to Tuesday Vargas. They were wed in Boracay in 2010.

Placido attended preparatory school in Saint Louis School Of Campo Filipino and Saint Louis University (Philippines) Baguio for high school. Placido graduated from STI College in 1998 with a degree in Computer Science.

Discography

sessiOnroad
Albums
Session Road (1999), Star Records
Suntok Sa Buwan (2004), Alpha Records
Bakit Hindi? (2006), Alpha Records
EP
Lagi Na Lamang Ba (Recorded 2008) (Independently released 2016)

Top Junk
Albums
Top Junk (2009, independent release under D Chord Records)
EP
Retox (2014, independent release under D Chord Records)

References 

1977 births
Living people
Filipino musicians